FC Juárez Femenil is a Mexican women's football club based in Ciudad Juárez. The club has been the women's section of FC Juárez since 2019.

The team was founded for 2019–20 Liga MX Femenil season, on June 11, 2019 FC Juárez bought Lobos BUAP. After making the purchase, FC Juarez had to assume all the BUAP's responsibilities, including the obligation to have a women's team. In July 2019, the team played its first game at Liga MX Femenil.

Personnel

Coaching staff

Players

Current squad
As of 16 July 2021

Former players

References

Association football clubs established in 2019
2019 establishments in Mexico
Women's association football clubs in Mexico
Liga MX Femenil teams
FC Juárez
Football clubs in Chihuahua (state)
Sports teams in Ciudad Juárez